Yerington Grammar School (or Yerington Grammar School No. 9) is a former school in Yerington, Nevada.  It is listed in the National Register of Historic Places, and is currently home to the Jeanne Dini Center, a community and cultural venue.

History
At the beginning of the 20th century, an expanding economy and population required a new school to be created. Yerington Grammar School No.9 began to be built.

Building
Two Reno architects were hired to design this 16,600 dollar building, C.D. McDonald and J.J. Beatty. Friedhoff and Hoeffel, two Reno contractors, constructed this -story building to accommodate one hundred children.

The bottom floor is made of rusticated concrete blocks, providing a foundation for the main body of the school. The face of the building is quite elaborate, with two balanced pedimented gables over two projecting bays, and a smaller gable over the main entrance. In 1935, this structure was enlarged according to plans created by Delongchamps, preserving the look of the building. This structure continued serving to function of Yerington's elementary school until 1980. A group of local people led by Jeanne Dini initiated the Yerington Grammar School no. 9 Restoration Project in the 1990s.  It was restored and transformed into the Yerington Cultural Center.

Location
Yerington Grammar School no. 9 is located at the intersection of California and Littel streets, two blocks off Main in Yerington, Nevada.

References

School buildings completed in 1911
Schools in Lyon County, Nevada
School buildings on the National Register of Historic Places in Nevada
Defunct schools in Nevada
National Register of Historic Places in Lyon County, Nevada
1911 establishments in Nevada